Andre Zuluaga (born August 24, 2003) is an American soccer player who plays as a goalkeeper for Las Vegas Lights in USL Championship.

Career

Youth 
Zuluaga played three years of youth soccer for Kendall SC before joining Inter Miami's academy ahead of the 2019-20 USSDA season.

Senior 
Zuluaga made his senior debut for Fort Lauderdale CF on September 12, 2020 in a 2-0 win against Orlando City B. Zuluaga was named to the USL League One team of the week for his shutout performance. In April 2021, Zuluaga signed a professional contract with Fort Lauderdale. 

On February 15, 2023, it was announced that Zuluaga had signed with USL Championship side Las Vegas Lights FC.

References

External links 
 
 Andre Zuluaga at TopDrawerSoccer.com

2003 births
Living people
American soccer players
Association football midfielders
Inter Miami CF II players
USL League One players
Soccer players from Miami
MLS Next Pro players
Las Vegas Lights FC players